James Erskine, Lord Grange (167920 January 1754) was a Scottish advocate, judge and politician. He served as Lord Justice Clerk and a Lord of Justiciary.

Life

The son of Charles Erskine, Earl of Mar, by his spouse Lady Mary, eldest daughter of George Maule, 2nd Earl of Panmure, he was also brother of John Erskine, 6th Earl of Mar. Educated as an advocate, he was raised to the bench on 18 October 1706. He was nominated a Lord of Justiciary in place of David Home, Lord Crocerig on 6 June the same year, and took the title Lord Grange. On 27 July 1710 he succeeded Adam Cockburn of Ormiston as Lord Justice Clerk.

He took no part in the Jacobite rising of 1715, although there is little doubt that at times he was in communication with the Jacobites; but was rather known for his piety and for his sympathy with the Presbyterians.

In 1724 he, and David Erskine, Lord Dun purchased the forfeited Earldom of Mar from the government, which they promptly reorganised, and sold off.

He is more famous, however, owing to the story of his wife's disappearance. This lady, Rachel Chiesley, was a woman of disordered intellect; probably with reason she suspected her husband of infidelity, and after some years of unhappiness Grange arranged a plan for her seizure.

In January 1732 she was conveyed with great secrecy from Edinburgh to the Monach Islands for two years, thence Hirta in St Kilda, where she remained for about ten years, thence she was taken to Assynt in Sutherland, and finally to Skye. To complete the idea that she was dead her funeral was publicly celebrated, but she survived until May 1745.

Meanwhile, in 1734 Grange resigned his offices in the Court of Session and Justiciary, and became a Member of Parliament where he was a bitter opponent of Sir Robert Walpole. His objective of being appointed Secretary of State for Scotland was a failure. For a short time after leaving parliament he returned to the Bar.

Erskine stood in opposition to the Witchcraft Act 1735, which – unlike previous laws – did not assume that witches actually existed and made pacts with Satan, but rather assumed that anyone who claimed to be actually practising witchcraft was a cheater seeking to defraud people. The only figure to offer significant opposition to the Act was Erskine. Erskine not only fervently believed in the existence of witchcraft, but, it has been argued, also held beliefs that were deeply rooted in "Scottish political and religious considerations" and which caused him to reject the Act. His objection to the Act "marked him out as an eccentric verging on the insane" among Members of Parliament, and in turn his political opponents would use it against him; one of his staunchest critics, Robert Walpole, who was then the de facto Prime Minister of the country, allegedly stating that he no longer considered Erskine to be a serious political threat as a result of his embarrassing opposition to the Act.

His Edinburgh mansion was on the east side of Niddry Wynd (later  replaced by Niddry Street) off the Royal Mile.

He died in London on 20 January 1754, aged 75 years.

Family

He married Rachel Chiesley, daughter of John Chiesley, who infamously murdered George Lockhart, Lord Carnwath in 1689. Rachel was thereafter raised by her uncle Robert Chieslie, Lord Provost of Edinburgh. Rachel had inherited a fortune in compensation to her uncles Robert and James who each lost a fortune in the Darien expedition but were posthumously compensated in the Act of Union 1707.

In Fiction
James Erskine, Lord Grange, features as a character in Andrew Drummond's fantasy novel. The Books of the Incarceration of the Lady Grange (2016).

References

 
 
 Edinburgh Magazine, 1817.
 An Historical Account of the Senators of the College of Justice of Scotland, by Sir David Dalrymple of Hailes, Bt., with some further editing and additions, Edinburgh, 1849.

Sources
 

1679 births
1754 deaths
Protestant Jacobites
Scottish Jacobites
Members of the Parliament of Great Britain for Scottish constituencies
Grange
Younger sons of earls
Members of the Faculty of Advocates
18th-century Scottish judges
Scottish Protestants
British MPs 1734–1741
British MPs 1741–1747